Howard W. Easterling (November 26, 1911 – September 6, 1993) was an American third baseman in Negro league baseball. He played between 1937 and 1954.

A native of Mount Olive, Mississippi, Easterling served in the US Army during World War II. He died in Collins, Mississippi in 1993 at age 81.

References

External links
 and Baseball-Reference Black Baseball stats and Seamheads
Negro League Baseball Players Association

1911 births
1993 deaths
American expatriate baseball players in Mexico
Baseball players from Mississippi
Chicago American Giants players
Homestead Grays players
New York Cubans players
Sultanes de Monterrey players
People from Mount Olive, Mississippi
United States Army personnel of World War II
African Americans in World War II
African-American United States Army personnel